Dudhu Chak (Punjabi) is a town in Shakargarh Tehsil, North-East of Narowal District, Punjab, Pakistan. The town is situated at the west bank of the River Ravi.

Popular schools, colleges and academies

Colleges 
 Sultan Memorial Public Model School and College, Dudhu Chak
 Tabinda Public Model School and College, Dudhu Chak

Schools 
 Govt. Primary School, Dudhu Chak
 Govt. Islamia High Schools for Boys, Dudhu Chak
 Govt. Islamia High Schools for Girls, Dudhu Chak
 Atique Academy Dudhuchak
Pacific Academy Dudhuchak
 Sultan Memorial Public Model School, Dudhu Chak
 Tabinda Public Model School, Dudhu Chak
 Al-Aziz Public High School, Dudhu Chak
 Al-Fatima Academy, Dudhu Chak
 Al-Raza Science Academy
 New Trand Science Academy, Dudhu Chak

References

Populated places in Narowal District